The Arafura catfish (Netuma proxima), also known as the Arafura sea catfish, is a species of catfish in the family Ariidae. It was described by James Douglas Ogilby in 1898, originally under the genus Arius. It inhabits marine, brackish and freshwaters in the western Pacific.

The diet of the Arafura catfish includes worms, finfish, crustaceans such as crabs and amphipods, mollusks, echinoderms, algae and insects.

References

Ariidae
Fish described in 1898